Broad Bay is a  freshwater lake located in Carroll County in eastern New Hampshire, United States, in the towns of Freedom and Ossipee. Broad Bay is part of a chain of four lakes with identical water levels, due to a dam located downstream in Effingham Falls. Upstream, a channel connects Broad Bay to Ossipee Lake, while a channel leads downstream through Leavitt Bay and Berry Bay to the start of the Ossipee River, which flows east into Maine and the Saco River.

Broad Bay is classified as a cold- and warmwater fishery, with observed species including largemouth bass, smallmouth bass, rainbow trout, lake trout, landlocked salmon, chain pickerel, yellow perch, white perch, sunfish, and brown bullhead.

See also

List of lakes in New Hampshire

References

Lakes of Carroll County, New Hampshire